There are several symbols of Manitoba, one of the ten provinces of Canada. These symbols are designated by The Coat of Arms, Emblems and the Manitoba Tartan Act, which came into force on Feb 1, 1988.

Symbols

References

Manitoba
Symbols
Canadian provincial and territorial symbols